Kováčová may refer to:

 Kováčová, feminine variant of the Slovak surname Kováč

or:
 Kováčová, Rožňava District, a village in Rožňava District, Slovakia
 Kováčová, Zvolen District, a village in Zvolen District, Slovakia

See also
Kováčovce, a village
Kovač, a surname
Kovač (disambiguation)
Kovači (disambiguation)
Kovačić (disambiguation)
Kovačići (disambiguation)
Kovačica (disambiguation)
Kovačice, a village
Kovačina, a village
Kovačevo (disambiguation)
Kovačevac (disambiguation)
Kovačevci (disambiguation)
Kovačevići (disambiguation)